Aq Bars (or Ak Bars) is the emblem of Tatarstan. It is an ancient Bulgar symbol translated as "White Leopard" or "Snow Leopard", and has been in use since 1991 as the official symbol of Tatarstan.

Historically, this symbol was used in Volga Bulgaria and the Khanate of Kazan (Qazan) – predecessors of Tatarstan – as a state symbol. The snow leopard symbol comes from the totems of one of the Bulgar tribes – the Barsil. According to legend, the Barsils founded Bilär in Volga Bulgaria.

The creator of the current emblem is the artist Rif Zagri uly Fakhretdinev.

Historical coats of arms
The Russian coat of arms of Volga Bulgaria: a green shield with a silver walking lamb, holding a red gonfalone, divided by a silver cross, with a golden staff.

See also
Ak Bars Kazan - this coat of arms is the hockey team's secondary logo, used extensively on their jerseys
Zilant

References

Tatarstan
Tatarstan
Heraldic beasts
Coats of arms with leopards